The Costa Rican Chess Championship is the yearly national chess championship of Costa Rica. The first edition was played in 1927.

List of champions
{| class="sortable wikitable"
! Nr !! Year !! Winner
|-
|	1	||	1927	||	Rómulo Salas
|-
|	2	||	1930	||	Juan José Loria
|-
|	3	||	1937	||	Carlos M. Valverde
|-
|	4	||	1938	||	Rosalía Escalante de Serrano
|-
|	5	||	1939	||	Joaquín Gutiérrez
|-
|	6	||	1940	||	Carlos M. Valverde
|-
|	7	||	1941	||	Carlos M. Valverde
|-
|	8	||	1942	||	Carlos M. Valverde
|-
|	9	||	1943	||	Joaquín Gutiérrez
|-
|	10	||	1944	||	Joaquín Gutiérrez
|-
|	11	||	1945	||	Carlos M. Valverde
|-
|	12	||	1946	||	Antonio Rojas
|-
|	13	||	1947	||	Rogelio Sotela
|-
|	14	||	1948	||	Jaime Soley
|-
|	15	||	1949	||	Rogelio Sotela
|-
|	16	||	1950	||	Rogelio Sotela
|-
|	17	||	1951	||	Rogelio Sotela
|-
|	18	||	1952	||	R. Charpentier
|-
|	19	||	1953	||	R. Charpentier
|-
|	20	||	1954	||	R. Charpentier
|-
|	21	||	1955	||	R. Charpentier
|-
|	22	||	1956	||	R. Charpentier
|-
|	23	||	1957	||	R. Charpentier
|-
|	24	||	1958	||	R. Charpentier
|-
|	25	||	1959	||	R. Charpentier
|-
|	26	||	1960	||	Pablo Amiguetti
|-
|	27	||	1961	||	José Ma. Soto
|-
|	28	||	1962	||	Walter Field
|-
|	29	||	1963	||	Pablo Amiguetti
|-
|	30	||	1964	||	Samuel Li Chen
|-
|	31	||	1965	||	Fernando Montero
|-
|	32	||	1966	||	Fernando Montero
|-
|	33	||	1968	||	Alfonso Morales
|-
|	34	||	1969	||	Jorge Van der Laat
|-
|	35	||	1970	||	Fernando Aguilar
|-
|	36	||	1971	||	Fernando Aguilar
|-
|	37	||	1972	||	Juan Leon Jimenez Molina
|-
|	38	||	1973	||	Jaime Vaglio Muñoz
|-
|	39	||	1974	||	Fernando Montero
|-
|	40	||	1975	||	Juan Leon Jimenez Molina
|-
|	41	||	1976	||	Jaime Vaglio Muñoz
|-
|	42	||	1977	||	Juan Leon Jimenez Molina
|-
|	43	||	1978	||	Juan Leon Jimenez Molina
|-
|	44	||	1979	||	William Charpentier
|-
|	45	||	1980	||	William Charpentier
|-
|	46	||	1981	||	William Charpentier
|-
|	47	||	1982	||	Eduardo Piza
|-
|	48	||	1983	||	Alexis Vargas
|-
|	49	||	1984	||	Francis Mayland
|-
|	50	||	1985	||	William Charpentier
|-
|	51	||	1986	||	Jaime Vaglio Muñoz
|-
|	52	||	1987	||	William Charpentier
|-
|	53	||	1989	||	William Charpentier
|-
|	54	||	1990	||	Bernal González Acosta
|-
|	55	||	1991	||	Bernal González Acosta
|-
|	56	||	1992	||	Sergio Minero Pineda
|-
|	57	||	1993	||	Bernal González Acosta
|-
|	58	||	1994	||	Alexis Murillo Tsijli
|-
|	59	||	1995	||	Bernal González Acosta
|-
|	60	||	1996	||	Bernal González Acosta
|-
|	61	||	1997	||	Alexis Murillo Tsijli
|-
|	62	||	1998	||	Leonardo Valdés
|-
|	63	||	1999	||	Sergio Minero Pineda
|-
|	64	||	2000	||	Bernal González Acosta
|-
|	65	||	2001	||	Bernal González Acosta
|-
|	66	||	2002	||	Leonardo Valdés
|-
|	67	||	2003	||	Manuel Bernal González
|-
|	68	||	2004	||	Sergio Minero Pineda
|-
|	69	||	2005	||	Bernal González Acosta
|-
|	70	||	2006	||	Bernal González Acosta
|-
|	71	||	2007	||	Leonardo Valdés
|-
|	72	||	2008	||	Bernal González Acosta
|-
|	73	||	2009	||	Mauricio Arias Santana
|-
|	74	||	2010	||	Bernal González Acosta
|-
|	75	||	2011	||	Bernal González Acosta
|-
|	76	||	2012	||	Leonardo Valdés 
|-
|	77	||	2013	||	Bernal González Acosta
|-
|	78	||	2014	||	Alexis Murillo Tsijli
|-
|	79	||	2015	||	Sergio Minero Pineda
|-
|	80	||	2016	||	Bernal González Acosta
|-
|   81  ||  2017    ||  Sergio Durán
|-
|   84  ||  2020    ||  Sergio Minero Pineda
|}

List of women's champions

{| class="sortable wikitable"
! Nr !! Year !! Winner
|-
|	1	||	1938    ||	Rosalía Escalante de Serrano
|-
|	2	||	1977	||	Emma Hernández
|-
|	3	||	1990	||	Laura Granados on tiebreak match (2.5–1.5) over Silvia Arroyo
|-
|	4	||	1991	||	Laura Granados
|-
|	5	||	1992	||	Natalia Chaves
|-
|	6	||	1993	||	Karla Ramírez on tiebreak match (2–0) over Adela Navarro
|-
|	7	||	1994	||	Meylin Villegas Loaiza
|-
|		||	1995	||	cancelled
|-
|	8	||	1996	||	Karla Ramírez
|-
|	9	||	1997	||	Meylin Villegas Loaiza
|-
|	10	||	1998	||	Meylin Villegas Loaiza
|-
|	11	||	1999	||	Meylin Villegas Loaiza
|-
|    	||	2001	||	Carolina Muñoz
|-
|       ||  2002    ||  Sofia Lowski
|}

References

Sources
Lists of champions: , 
Full results from The Week in Chess: TWIC77 (1996), TWIC254 (1999), TWIC294 (2000), TWIC451 (2003), TWIC507 (2004), TWIC559 (2005)
La Nacion, Jan 24, 2017: 

Chess national championships
Women's chess national championships
Championship
1927 in chess
Recurring sporting events established in 1927
1927 establishments in Costa Rica